Ruddy Lilian Thuram-Ulien (born 1 January 1972) is a French former professional footballer who played as a defender. 

He began playing football professionally in his homeland with Monaco and played in the top flight in France, Italy and Spain for over 15 seasons, with notable stints in Serie A with both Parma and Juventus before finishing his career with Barcelona. With France, Thuram was a key player for the team that won the 1998 FIFA World Cup; his side also won UEFA Euro 2000, and he helped them to runners-up at the 2006 World Cup. Thuram was the most capped player in the history of the France national team with 142 appearances between 1994 and 2008 until Hugo Lloris surpassed the mark in 2022.

A quick, powerful and versatile player, he was capable of playing both as a centre-back or as a right-back, and was competent both offensively and defensively. Despite his physical and aggressive playing style, Thuram has been described as a "studious" figure off the pitch; in 2010, he became a UNICEF ambassador, and has stood out for his initiatives to fight against racism.

Early life
Thuram was born in Guadeloupe in the French West Indies. His family relocated to mainland France in 1981.

Club career
Thuram's football career began with Monaco in Ligue 1 in 1991. He then transferred to Parma (1996–2001) and then to Juventus (2001–2006) for £25 million, and eventually to Barcelona in 2006.

Monaco
Thuram started his professional career with Monaco in 1991. He only made one appearance that season, but was officially promoted to the first team the following season, when he would go on to make 19 appearances. 

He was inserted into the starting XI by the end of 1992 and would go on to make 155 league appearances for the Ligue 1 outfit, before transferring to Parma in the summer of 1996. He made his national team debut in 1994, while at Monaco. With Monaco, he most notably won the Coupe de France in 1991, also reaching the final of the 1991–92 European Cup Winners' Cup. 

However, Thuram scored his only UEFA Champions League goal in his career for Monaco in a 4–1 victory over Spartak Moscow in the 1993–94 season.

Parma
In July 1996, Thuram made a high-profile transfer to Italy to join Serie A club Parma. In his first season, he made over 40 appearances for the club in all competitions, scoring one goal, as Parma finished second in the 1996–97 Serie A to Juventus. He maintained a starting position in defence throughout his time with Parma, making 163 Serie A appearances and scoring one league goal. In all, he made over 200 appearances for the club, really making a name for himself, also earning caps for France. 

Following another impressive season in 2000–01, where Parma reached the Coppa Italia final, and finishing the Serie A season in fourth place, Thuram, along with teammate Gianluigi Buffon, transferred to Juventus. His transfer cost the club 80 billion Italian lire (€41,316,552). 

While at Parma, along with eventual Juventus teammates Buffon and Fabio Cannavaro, Thuram won both the UEFA Cup and the Coppa Italia during the 1998–99 season, immediately followed by the 1999 Supercoppa Italiana.

Juventus
In the summer of 2001, Thuram made a transfer to Juventus, along with goalkeeper Gianluigi Buffon. Thuram formed defensive partnerships with the likes of Ciro Ferrara, Paolo Montero, Gianluca Pessotto, Mark Iuliano, Alessandro Birindelli, Igor Tudor, Gianluca Zambrotta, Nicola Legrottaglie, Fabio Cannavaro, Giorgio Chiellini, Federico Balzaretti and Jonathan Zebina during his five-year tenure with the club. In his first season with the club, as a right back under Marcello Lippi, Thuram won the 2001–02 Serie A title, also reaching the final of the 2001–02 Coppa Italia. Juventus started the following season by winning the 2002 Supercoppa Italiana, and defended their Serie A title, also reaching the UEFA Champions League final, where they were defeated by rivals Milan on penalties.

Juventus won the 2003 Supercoppa Italiana the following season, reaching another Coppa Italia final, but finished in a disappointing 3rd place in Serie A, and failed to progress past the second round in the Champions League. During the 2004–05 and 2005–06 seasons under coach Fabio Capello, Thuram, along with Fabio Cannavaro in the centre of defence, with Gianluigi Buffon in goal, Jonathan Zebina at right back and Gianluca Zambrotta at left back formed one of the most expensive, but also most feared, defences in Europe and Italy. During these next two seasons with the club, Thuram won the Scudetto two more times with Juventus, although these consecutive league titles were later revoked due to Juventus' involvement in the 2006 Italian football scandal (calciopoli). After five years with Juve, Thuram transferred to Barcelona in the Spanish La Liga, in the wake of the calciopoli scandal. He managed over 200 total appearances for the club, with two goals.

Barcelona

On 24 July 2006, Thuram signed with Barcelona for €5 million after Juventus were relegated to Serie B due to the calciopoli scandal.

In Thuram's last season (2007–08), he was the third- or fourth-choice centre-back after Carles Puyol, Gabriel Milito and Rafael Márquez. 

On 26 June 2008, he was reported as having signed a one-year contract with an option for another year with Paris Saint-Germain. The deal, however, was cancelled shortly after because he was diagnosed with a heart defect that had caused the death of his brother. On 2 August, he announced his final retirement from professional football due to his condition.

International career

After becoming world champion in 1998, Thuram was an integral part of France's triumph at UEFA Euro 2000, which led to the team being ranked by FIFA as number one from 2001–2002. He also played in the 2002 World Cup, 2006 World Cup, Euro 1996, Euro 2004 and Euro 2008, in addition to winning the 2003 FIFA Confederations Cup. In France's 2–1 group win over England at Euro 2004, Thuram became the third Frenchman to 100 caps, after fellow 1998 champions Didier Deschamps and Marcel Desailly.

1998 World Cup

Thuram was named in the French squad for the 1998 World Cup and played a key part in their entire tournament, most notably in the semi final against Croatia. After getting caught out of position and being at fault for Croatia's opening goal, Thuram went on to score a brace, his only international goals, and give France a 2–1 win to take them to the final where the team defeated Brazil 3–0 to win their first World Cup. Thuram was awarded the Bronze Ball as the third most valuable player in the tournament. He, Bixente Lizarazu, Laurent Blanc and Marcel Desailly comprised the backbone of the French defence that conceded only two goals in seven matches.

2006 World Cup
After a brief international retirement, France coach Raymond Domenech convinced Thuram to return to the French team on 17 August 2005, along with fellow "Golden Generation" teammates Zinedine Zidane and Claude Makélélé, as Les Bleus struggled to qualify for the 2006 World Cup. Thuram's centre back partnership with William Gallas was to be the foundation for France's progression to the final. Thuram earned his 116th cap for France in the group stage match against South Korea in Leipzig on 18 June 2006. In that game he equalled Desailly's record number of caps, which he broke in the final group stage match, a 2–0 win over Togo in Cologne on 23 June 2006, winning his 117th cap. He was named the man of the match in France's semi-final 1–0 victory against Portugal, coincidentally the same distinction he had earned eight years earlier at the semi-finals of the 1998 World Cup.

Euro 2008
On 9 June 2008, Thuram took the field against Romania in a group match, and became the first player to make 15 UEFA European Championship finals appearances. The former record of 14 appearances was held by Zinedine Zidane, Luís Figo and Karel Poborský. He played one more game during the tournament, raising the number of his appearances to 16, which record was then equaled a few days later by Edwin van der Sar from the Netherlands in the quarter-finals. Thuram was the captain of France in the tournament. Along with Claude Makélélé, he announced his retirement from international football on 17 June 2008, after France's 2–0 loss to Italy. He finished his career with the national team as France's most capped player with 142 appearances. His record was broken by Hugo Lloris in the quarter-finals of the 2022 FIFA World Cup.

Style of play

Thuram was an extremely dominant, consistent, athletic and attentive footballer, who was considered by pundits to be one of the best defenders in the world in his prime. As a defender, he was known for his strength, pace, stamina and his outstanding physical, tactical, and technical attributes, as well as his elegance, intelligence, ability to read the game, his heavy marking of opponents, and his aggressive tackling, which made him difficult to beat in one on one situations; he also excelled in the air. As a full-back, he was known for his ability to make attacking runs up the flank and contribute to his team's offensive play after winning back the ball. A large, powerful and versatile player, who was equally competent offensively as he was defensively, he could play on either flank or in the centre, due to his ability with either foot, often alternating between playing as a centre-back or as a right-back, and was even deployed in midfield on occasion. In spite of his physical and tenacious playing style, he was also known to be a fair player.

Personal life
Thuram's cousin is Amiens player Yohann Thuram-Ulien. He has two sons with his first wife Sandra, Marcus (born 6 August 1997) and Khéphren (born 26 March 2001), and both became professional footballers. He named his sons after Jamaican activist Marcus Garvey and Egyptian pharaoh Khephren, respectively.

From 2007 to 2013, Thuram was in a relationship with Karine Le Marchand, a French TV host. In August 2022 he married journalist Kareen Guiock, whom he met in 2015; they wed at the Palace of Fontainebleau.

Media
Thuram was sponsored by sportswear company Nike and appeared in Nike commercials. In a global Nike advertising campaign in the run-up to the 2002 World Cup in Korea and Japan, he starred in a "Secret Tournament" commercial (branded "Scorpion KO") directed by Terry Gilliam, appearing alongside football players such as Thierry Henry, Ronaldo, Edgar Davids, Fabio Cannavaro, Francesco Totti, Ronaldinho, Luís Figo and Hidetoshi Nakata, with former player Eric Cantona the tournament "referee".

Political engagement

Beyond his football career, Thuram has always shown political engagement, and has frequently spoken out against racism. In such, during the French riots in November 2005, Thuram took a position against Nicolas Sarkozy, the head of the conservative political party (and future president) UMP and then Minister of the Interior. Thuram was opposed to the verbal attacks against young people that the then-Minister made when he talked about the "scum", and he said that Nicolas Sarkozy never lived in a "banlieue", areas of low-income housing surrounding French cities.

On 6 September 2006, Thuram sparked controversy when he invited 80 people, who were expelled by French Minister of the Interior Nicolas Sarkozy from a flat where they lived illegally, to the football match between France and Italy. He has also engaged in campaigns that favour the Catalan language in Northern Catalonia.

In November 2011, Thuram curated an exhibition at the Musée du quai Branly entitled "Human Zoos: The Invention of the Savage". It examined the human zoos that traced the practice of using colonial subjects as exhibits in zoos and freak shows. The material in the exhibition runs from the parade of Brazil's Tupinamba "savages" for the royal entrance of King Henry II of France in 1550 in Rouen, to the last "living spectacle" of Congo villagers exhibited in Brussels in 1958.

In January 2013, Thuram took part in a march through Paris by supporters of the Ayrault government's plan to legalise same-sex marriage. He had previously explained that he supported same-sex marriage in the name of equal rights (comparing the denial of equality for homosexuals to the denial of equal rights for women and for black people in earlier periods of history), and in the name of France's secular principles (laïcité), rejecting religious arguments against civil marriage. He also expressed support for the right of same-sex couples to adopt children.

Career statistics

Club

International

Scores and results list France's goal tally first, score column indicates score after each Thuram goal.

Honours
Parma
Coppa Italia: 1998–99
Supercoppa Italiana: 1999
UEFA Cup: 1998–99

Juventus
Serie A: 2001–02, 2002–03
Supercoppa Italiana: 2002

Barcelona
Supercopa de España: 2006

France
FIFA World Cup: 1998, runner-up: 2006
UEFA European Championship: 2000
FIFA Confederations Cup: 2003

Individual
French Player of the Year: 1997
Guerin d'Oro: 1997
FIFA World Cup Bronze Ball: 1998
FIFA World Cup All-Star Team: 1998, 2006
ESM Team of the Year: 1998–99, 2002–03
UEFA Euro Team of the Tournament: 2000
FIFA 100: 2004
FIFPro World XI: 2006
Trophée d'honneur UNFP: 2009
Équipe type spéciale 20 ans des trophées UNFP: 2011

Orders
Knight of the Legion of Honour: 1998
Officer of the Legion of Honour: 2013

See also
 List of men's footballers with 100 or more international caps

References

External links

1972 births
Living people
Thuram family
French people of Guadeloupean descent
Black French sportspeople
Guadeloupean footballers
French footballers
Association football defenders
RCP Fontainebleau players
FC Melun players
Entente Melun-Fontainebleau 77 players
AS Monaco FC players
Parma Calcio 1913 players
Juventus F.C. players
FC Barcelona players
Ligue 1 players
Serie A players
La Liga players
UEFA Cup winning players
France under-21 international footballers
France international footballers
Competitors at the 1993 Mediterranean Games
UEFA Euro 1996 players
1998 FIFA World Cup players
UEFA Euro 2000 players
2002 FIFA World Cup players
2003 FIFA Confederations Cup players
UEFA Euro 2004 players
2006 FIFA World Cup players
UEFA Euro 2008 players
Mediterranean Games medalists in football
Mediterranean Games bronze medalists for France
FIFA World Cup-winning players
UEFA European Championship-winning players
FIFA Confederations Cup-winning players
FIFA Century Club
FIFA 100
French expatriate footballers
French expatriate sportspeople in Monaco
French expatriate sportspeople in Italy
French expatriate sportspeople in Spain
Expatriate footballers in Monaco
Expatriate footballers in Italy
Expatriate footballers in Spain
Chevaliers of the Légion d'honneur
Officiers of the Légion d'honneur
French anti-racism activists
French LGBT rights activists
People from Pointe-à-Pitre